Goethean science concerns the natural philosophy (German Naturphilosophie "philosophy of nature") of German writer Johann Wolfgang von Goethe. Although primarily known as a literary figure, Goethe did research in morphology, anatomy, and optics. He also developed a phenomenological approach to natural history, an alternative to Enlightenment natural science, which is still debated today among scholars. 

His works in natural history include his 1790 Metamorphosis of Plants and his 1810 book Theory of Colors. His work in optics, and his polemics against the reigning Newtonian theory of optics, were poorly received by the natural history establishment of his time.

Background
The rationalist scientific method, which had worked well with inert nature (Bacon's natura naturata), was less successful in seeking to understand vital nature (natura naturans). At the same time, the rational-empirical model based on the predominance of mentative thinking (German: sinnen) via the intellect (German: Sinn), started by Descartes and advanced most notably in France, was leading to confusion and doubt rather than clarity.  Especially in subjective topics, equally rational arguments could be made for widely divergent propositions or conceptions. 

The more empirical approach favored in Britain (Hume) had led to viewing reality as sense-based, including the mind; how, what we perceive is only a mental representation of what is real, and what is real we can never really know. 

As one observer summarizes, there were two 'games' being played in philosophy at the time – one rational and one empirical, both of which led to total skepticism and an epistemological crisis.

The Kantian problem
Immanuel Kant in Prussia undertook a major rescue operation to preserve the validity of knowledge derived via reason (science), as well as of knowledge going beyond the rational mind, that is of human liberty and of life beyond simply an expression of 'the chance whirlings of unproductive particles' (Coleridge). Kant's writings had an immediate and major impact on Western philosophy and triggered a philosophical movement known as German idealism (Fichte, Hegel, Schelling), which sought to overcome and transcend the chasm Kant had formalized between the sense-based and the super-sensible worlds, in his attempt to 'save the appearances' (Owen Barfield), that is, to preserve the validity of scientific or rational knowledge as well as that of faith.

Kant's solution was an epistemological dualism: we cannot know the thing-in-itself (Das Ding an Sich) beyond our mental representation of it.  While there is a power (productive imagination – produktive Einbildungskraft) that produces a unity ("transcendental unity of apperception"), we cannot know or experience it in itself; we can only see its manifestations and create representations about it in our mind. The realm beyond the senses also could not be known via reason, but only via faith. To seek to know the realm beyond the senses amounts to what Kant termed an 'adventure of reason'.

Goethe's approach to vital nature
Goethe undertook his 'adventure of reason', starting with the "crisis" in botany, the merely and purely mechanical classification-taxonomy of plant life. In so doing, Goethe also "wagered a sweeping theory about Nature itself."

Goethe was concerned with the narrowing specialization in science and emphasis on accumulating data in a merely mechanical manner, devoid of human values and human development. Linnaean botanic taxonomic system represented this in his day, a Systema naturae. Goethe intuited the practice of rational science promoted a narrowing and contracting interplay between humanity and nature. For Goethe, any form of science based only upon physical-material characteristics and then only selected external traits, led to epistemic impoverishment and a reduction of human knowledge.

What was needed was increased ability to derive meaning from voluminous external data by looking at it from both external-sensory angles, and from an internal angle where thinking, feeling, intuition, imagination, and inspiration could all contribute to conclusions reached by the experimenter.

Linnaean taxonomy was already coming under criticism from Comte de Buffon, who argued the mechanistic classification of the outer forms of nature (natura naturata) needed to be replaced by a study of the interrelation of natural forces and natural historical change.

For Goethe, the collection of new knowledge is inseparable from a Geschichte des Denkens und Begreifens, a history of thinking and conceptualization. Knowledge is also about association, not only about separation, as Coleridge also explained in his Essays on Method (see Romantic epistemology).

While arranging material phenomena in logical linear sequence is a valid scientific method, it had to be carried out under a correct and humanistic organizing idea (Bacon's lumen siccum), itself grounded in nature, or natural law, often boundaried by multiple, lawful pairs of polarity.

Goethe proposed experimenters seek the natural, lawful organizing ideas or archetype behind specific natural phenomena. Phase One was to immerse one's self in a living interaction with the natural phenomena to be studied, with all available senses. Goethe valued "the labor of experimentation".

This contrasted greatly with a trend in rational Natural Science to 'abandon' nature itself and formulate an abstract hypothesis; then, experiment to test whether your hypothesis can be verified. Goethe considered this an 'artificial experience' which 'tears' individual manifestations out of the meaningful context of the whole (e.g., Newton's color hypothesis).

Instead, Goethe's experimenter must adopt a more living, more humane, approach aspiring to enter into the living essence of nature, as perceived in the phenomenon studied.

For Goethe, success meant penetrating to the crucial, underlying, sensorily-invisible archetype-pattern: the Ur-phänomen. The Experimenter aspires to allow the phenomena to reveal its inherent order and lawfulness. While often invisible, this lawfulness is clearly objective, not subjective, and not invented by the experimenter (see Goethe's description of a dandelion, or Steiner's copied version).

Ernst Lehrs went further in emphasizing how all objective manifestation comes from the movement of physical-material objects as motion comes to rest (Man or Matter, 3rd ed. preferred).

Goethean Science stands apart from Cartesian-Newtonian Science in its alternative value system. Regarding quantification, Goethean Science is nonetheless rigorous as to experimental method and the matter of qualities.

The German philosopher and mystic Rudolf Steiner, who was at one point an assistant editor of the standard edition of Goethe's works, applied Goethe's methodology of a living approach to nature to the performing and fine arts. This gives Anthroposophic visual and performing arts their air of going beyond the mere outer form of things (natura naturata) to discern a more inner nature (natura naturans). Steiner hoped to relate the human sphere with all of Nature through the arts; including, the art of Goethean Science.

Goethe's ur-phenomena
Five arts was Goethe's method of transmuting his observation of human nature into sharable form.  Drawing from his novel, Elective Affinities (Wahlverwandschaften), Goethe discerned a geheime Verwandschaft (hidden relationship) of parts that explains how one form can transform into another form while being part of an underlying archetypal form (Ur-phänomen).

It is this organizing idea or form that guides the consideration of the parts; it is a Bild or virtual image that "emerges and re-emerges from the interaction of experience and ideas". This consideration is a special type of thinking (noetic ideation or denken) carried out with a different organ of cognizance to that of the brain (mentation  or sinnen), one that involves an act of creative imagination, what Goethe terms "the living imaginal beholding of Nature" (das lebendige Anschauen der Natur). Goethe's nature (natura naturans, the activity of "nature naturing" – as distinguished from natura naturata, "nature natured", the domain of naturally formed objects) is one in constant flux and flow, but nonetheless governed by law, logic and intelligence above the mind. To approach vital nature requires a different cognitive capacity (denken) and cognitive organ (Gemüt) from that used to perceive inert nature (sinnen based on the Intellect or Sinn).

Experiment as interactive experience
In his 1792 essay "The experiment as mediator between subject and object", Goethe developed an original philosophy of science, which he used in his research. The essay underscores his experiential standpoint. "The human being himself, to the extent he makes sound use of his senses, is the most exact physical apparatus that can exist."

While the fixed Linnaean system, like classical physics, its distinctions broke down increasingly at the border, reflected in the increasing confusion as to how to classify the growing number of plant forms being brought forward.  This led to greater division rather than greater unity. Goethe's discovery of an underlying order directly challenged the fixed, static view of nature of the Linnaean taxonomy (based on artificial types arrived at by choosing certain features and ignoring others), but also the tendency of natural science to study vital nature by means of the methodology used on inert nature (physics, chemistry).

The Cartesian-Newtonian method presupposes separation between observer and observed.  Goethe considered this a barrier.  As Wellmon observes, Goethe's concept of science is one in which "not only the object of observation changes and moves but also the subject of observation." Thus, a true science of vital nature would be based on an approach that was itself vital, dynamic, labile. The key for this is a living, direct, interactive experience (Erlebnis) involving the mind, but also higher faculties more  participatory and Imaginative (Gemüt), not dissociative and separative (Sinn).

Only since the 1970s have other mainstream scientists come to be interested in Goethe's more holistic-humanistic approach to experiments.

In his study on color (Farbenlehre), Goethe challenged the view observers can look devoid and naive of theoretical context; likewise, challenging the assumption of shared common neutral language in science research and innovation.   Rather Goethe believed every act of looking at a thing turns into observation, every act of observation turns into mentation, every act of mentation turns into associations.  Thus it is evident  we theorize every time we look attentively out into the world."  In support of Goethe, Feyerabend wrote: "Newton... did not give the explanation [of light] but simply re-described what he saw...[and] introduced the machinery of the very same theory he wanted to prove."

For Goethe, the ultimate aim of science was two-fold, both increase to the database of human knowledge; second, as a method for the metamorphosis of the experimenter. In Goethean Science, experiment is the 'mediator between object [natural phenomena] and subject ]the experimenter].'  All experiments then become two-fold, potentially revealing as much about natural phenomena as they reveal the experimenter to him or herself.

Goethe's methodology is mutual and intimate interaction of observer and observed; and, what transpires over time.  Ideally as the experimenter's observed knowledge grows from his study of natural phenomena, so does his capacity for inner awareness, insight, Imagination, Intuition and Inspiration.

Where Cartesian-Newtonian science accepts only a single, practical syllogism about experimenters and research topics, Goethean Science demonstrates practicing science as an art, practice directed towards refining the experimenter's perceptions over time, heightening them towards Imagination, Inspiration and Intuition.

Goethe's epistemology
Goethe's method of science as art, of experiment as mediator between experimenter and Nature, can be applied to studies of every kind.  Where Cartesian-Newtonian science defines and values the expansion of knowledge as a logical and linear march towards accumulating facts, Goethean Science defines and values the expansion of knowledge as:
1) Observing organic transformation in natural phenomena over time (historical progression); and
2) Organic transformation of the inner life of the experimenter.

Goethe developed two dynamic concepts – one of polarity (developed in his Chromatology) and one of logical-linear sequence (Morphology).  These are applicable across all domains.

For Goethe understanding vital nature (natura naturans) is very much a function of taking impressions and activating thereby responses via the Gemüt (empathy, perhaps also compassion) so that one 'becomes what one perceives'. 

The Kantian view is the realm of quantity and thing is separate from quality and phenomenon.  Therefore, we can never be certain what we perceive is objectively real.

Goethe's new way of thinking (denken) is a parallel order of science [more a distinct, separate, more holistic paradigm], useful for getting past the heavy cognitive curtain erected by Kant, where only utilitarian ideas and science are valued.

As Amrine states, Goethe accepted the mathematical approach (mathesis) was appropriate for inert nature.  However to become truly human, we cannot hold mathesis at the center of our life—apart from and dominating over—rational Feeling.  Anything less than truly human values at the center of our life are inappropriate and counter-productive.

Goethe and the idea of evolution
In the 1790s, Goethe rediscovered the premaxilla in humans, known as the incisive bone. He cited this as morphological evidence of humanity's connection to other mammalian species. 

Goethe writes in Story of My Botanical Studies (1831): 

Andrew Dickson White also writes with respect to evolutionary thought, in A History of the Warfare of Science with Theology in Christendom (1896):
About the end of the eighteenth century fruitful suggestions and even clear presentations of this or that part of a large evolutionary doctrine came thick and fast, and from the most divergent quarters. Especially remarkable were those from Erasmus Darwin in England, Maupertuis in France, Oken in Switzerland, and  Herder, and, most brilliantly of all, from Goethe in Germany.

Reception
Arthur Schopenhauer expanded on Goethe's research in optics using a different methodology in his On Vision and Colors.

Rudolf Steiner presents Goethe's approach to science as phenomenological in the Kürschner edition of Goethe's writings. Steiner elaborated on this in the books Goethean Science (1883) and
Theory of Knowledge Implicit in Goethe's World-Conception (1886). in which he emphasizes the need of the perceiving organ of intuition in order to grasp Goethe's biological archetype (i.e. The Typus).

Steiner's branch of Goethean Science was extended by Oskar Schmiedel and Wilhelm Pelikan, who did research using Steiner's interpretations.

Ludwig Wittgenstein's discussions of Goethe's Theory of Colors were published as Bemerkungen über die Farben (Remarks on Color).

Goethe's vision of holistic science inspired biologist and paranormal researcher Rupert Sheldrake.He went to an Anglican boarding school and then took biology at Cambridge, studying "life" by killing animals and then grinding them up to extract their DNA. This was troubling. Rescue came when a friend turned him on to Goethe. This old German's 18th century vision of "holistic science" appealed to the young Brit very much. Sheldrake used Goethe to investigate how the lilies of the field actually become lilies of the field. Sheldrake is famous for the term "morphogenetic field" actually a quote from one of Steiner's students, Poppelbaum.

American philosopher Walter Kaufmann argued that Freud's psychoanalysis was a "poetic science" in Goethe's sense.

In 1998, David Seamon and Arthur Zajonc wrote Goethe's way of science: a phenomenology of nature.

Also in 1998, Henri Bortoft wrote The Wholeness of Nature: Goethe's Science of Conscious Participation in Nature in which he discusses the relevance and importance of Goethe's approach to modern scientific thought.

Biologist Brian Goodwin (1931-2009) in his book How the Leopard Changed Its Spots : The Evolution of Complexity claimed that organisms as dynamic systems are the primary agents of creative evolutionary adaptation, in the book Goodwin stated: "The ideas I am developing in this book are very much in the Goethean spirit."

According to Dan Dugan, Steiner was a champion of the following pseudoscientific claims:

wrong color theory;
obtuse criticism of the theory of relativity;
weird ideas about motions of the planets;
supporting vitalism;
doubting germ theory;
weird approach to physiological systems;
"the heart is not a pump".

Anthony Storr declared about Steiner: "His belief system is so eccentric, so unsupported by evidence, so manifestly bizarre, that rational skeptics are bound to consider it delusional.... But, whereas Einstein's way of perceiving the world by thought became confirmed by experiment and mathematical proof, Steiner's remained intensely subjective and insusceptible of objective confirmation."

See also
 Romanticism in science
 Oswald Spengler

References

External links
 Goethe and the Molecular Aesthetic, Maura C. Flannery St. John's University
 Goethe at the Centre for Philosophy
 Goethe's Sensuous Imagination
 The Nature Institute
 Goethe's Theory of Colours
 Seeing Nature Whole — A Goethean Approach
 Goethe, Nature, and Phenomenology
 Doing Goethean Science
 Exploring Goethean Science
 Goethean Science
 Goethean Science, an online book by Rudolf Steiner

Johann Wolfgang von Goethe
18th century in science
19th century in science
18th-century philosophy
19th-century philosophy
Phenomenology
Pseudoscience
Romanticist Science